Emanuele Colarieti (born 14 July 1999) is an Italian footballer who played as a midfielder for Anagni.

Professional career
Colarieti joined Latina from the youth academy of Lazio in the summer of 2016. He made his professional debut for Latina in a Serie B 2-1 loss to Avellino on 18 May 2017.

References

External links
 
 
 Colarieti Serie A Profile

1999 births
Footballers from Rome
Living people
Italian footballers
Latina Calcio 1932 players
Serie B players
Association football midfielders